This is a list of board games invented or developed in Japan.

Japanese board games
board games
Japanese board games